Janiece Altagracia Dilone (born May 13, 1994), known mononymously as Dilone, is an American model. She has been on the cover of Allure and is currently ranked one of the Top 50 models in the industry by models.com.

Early life
Dilone has nine siblings and is of Dominican descent. She goes by Dilone because she wanted to represent her family.

Career
Dilone started modeling at 18. She is signed with DNA Model Management and got her big break in Marc Jacobs's fall 2016 show. She gained wider exposure in the 2016 and 2017 Victoria's Secret Fashion Shows. In her debut season, she walked in over 51 shows.

She has starred in advertisements for David Yurman, Balmain, American Eagle Outfitters, H&M, Stella McCartney, Coach, and Versace.

Dilone can be seen alongside models like Adwoa Aboah, Issa Lish, Maria Borges, and Binx Walton in Sephora's "Let Beauty Together" campaign in their stores.

Personal life 
She is openly bisexual and lives in Brooklyn.

See also 
 LGBT culture in New York City
 List of LGBT people from New York City

Notes

References 

1994 births
Living people
American people of Dominican Republic descent
Bisexual women
Hispanic and Latino American female models
LGBT models
LGBT people from New York (state)
LGBT Hispanic and Latino American people
Models from New York City
21st-century American LGBT people
21st-century American women